Tammy Cheung is a Hong Kong documentary filmmaker.

Cheung was born in Shanghai, China. Her family moved to Hong Kong, where Cheung grew up. She later went to Montreal, Quebec, Canada, to study film at Concordia University in the mid 1980s.

In 1999, she made her first documentary film, Invisible Women, which follows the lives of three Indian women in Hong Kong. She is an admirer of the American filmmaker Frederick Wiseman, and uses the style of Direct Cinema in her films.

In 2004, with other like-minded individuals from the fields of film, culture and education, Cheung founded Visible Record, which distributes and promotes documentary films in Hong Kong. The non-profit organisation also hosts the annual Chinese Documentary Festival.

In the past decade, Cheung has been regarded as one of the most respected documentary filmmakers in Hong Kong.

References

Living people
Hong Kong film producers
Date of birth missing (living people)
Hong Kong women artists
Year of birth missing (living people)